Daniela is a Spanish-language telenovela television series produced by the United States-based television network Telemundo and the Mexican production company Argos Comunicacion. This limited-run series ran for 120 episodes from May 6 to October 18, 2002. Daniela was aired in eleven countries around the world.

Cast
Litzy as Daniela Gamboa
Rodrigo de la Rosa as Mauricio Lavalle
Osvaldo Benavides as Andres Miranda
Ximena Rubio as Paola Arango
Marta Zamora as Enriqueta Montijo De Gamboa
Rene Gatica as Poncho Gamboa
Pilar Mata as Laura Arango
Marco Treviño as Osvaldo
Elizabeth Guindi as Regina Lavalle
Luis Cardenas as Federico Arango
Socorro de la Campa
Teresa Tuccio as Gabriela Arango
Magali Boysselle as Maria Elena 'La Nena'
Masha Kostiurina as Marylin Gamboa
Alexandra de la Mora as Roger Gamboa / Renata Vogel
Gustavo Navarro as Larry Campbell
Alma Frether as Camila Lavalle
Tara Parra as Chelito Gamboa
Lucha Moreno
Claudia Irobo
Armando Pascual
Roberto Escobar as Armando Lavalle
Elvira Monsell as Isabel Miranda

International release
  ABS-CBN aired between 2002–2003 in Philippines.
  Tedi Tv passed in 2002–2003 in Angola.
  TV Markíza started to air this telenovela on January 28, 2004 and the rerun was aired in 2006, in Slovakia. The telenovela is dubbed in Slovak.
  Indosiar aired the show during mornings in 2004, and the rerun was aired in the mid of 2008 as midnight show, in Indonesia.
  RTV Pink started to air this telenovela on October 7, 2009 and MHC on October 17, 2011 in Serbia.
  Telemetro started to air this telenovela on May 10, 2011 in Panama.
  Al Sumaria started to air this telenovela in October, 2011 in Iraq. The telenovela is dubbed in Iraqi Arabic.
  OTV began to air it in December 2013 in Lebanon, dubbed in Lebanese Arabic.
  Mauritius Broadcasting Corporation aired this telenovela in 2014 on MBC 2 and rebroadcast on Cine 12 in Mauritius. The telenovela is dubbed in French.

References

External links
 

2002 telenovelas
2002 American television series debuts
2002 American television series endings
2002 Mexican television series debuts
2002 Mexican television series endings
Spanish-language American telenovelas
Mexican telenovelas
Argos Comunicación telenovelas
Telemundo telenovelas